Fermoy (formerly also Armoy) is a barony in County Cork in Ireland. It is bordered by the baronies of Orrery and Kilmore to the north-west; Duhallow to the west; Barretts to the south-west; Barrymore to the south; Condons and Clangibbon to the east; and Coshlea, County Limerick to the north. It is bounded to the south by the Nagle Mountains and the valley of the Munster Blackwater. The Ballyhoura Mountains mark the northern boundary. A tributary of the Blackwater, the Awbeg has two branches in its upper stretches; one branch forms the northern boundary while the other near Buttevant, forms the western limit. To the east, lies another Blackwater tributary, the Funcheon. Anomalously, the namesake town of Fermoy is actually in the barony of Condons and Clangibbon. The town with the greatest population in the barony is Mallow (8578 people per Census of 2006).

Legal context
Baronies were created after the Norman invasion of Ireland as divisions of counties and were used in the administration of justice and the raising of revenue. While baronies continue to be officially defined units, they have been administratively obsolete since 1898. However, they continue to be used in land registration and in specification, such as in planning permissions. In many cases, a barony corresponds to an earlier Gaelic túath which had submitted to the Crown.

History
The túath of Fermoy was under the O'Keeffe family in Gaelic times. After the Norman invasion of Ireland, the territory was divided, with the part corresponding to the modern barony claimed by the Flemings and by marriage passing to the Roches, who were styled Lords of Fermoy or Viscount Fermoy, and for whom Castletownroche is named. The other part of the túath, which included the Cistercian abbey of Fermoy at the site of the later town, went to the Condon family, as reflected in the modern barony name of Condons and Clangibbon. In the 1660s, land in the barony was granted to Sir Richard Gethin, 1st Baronet.

Civil parishes and settlements 
Settlements in the barony include 
Ballindangan, 
Ballydahin,  
Ballyhooly, 
Castletownroche,  
Doneraile,  
Glanworth,  
Killavullen,  
Knockraha,  
Mallow,  
Newtown Ballyhay,  
New Twopothouse,  
and 
Shanballymore;

Civil parishes wholly or partly in the barony are: 
Ardskeagh,
Ballydeloughy,
Ballyhay,
Ballyhooly,
Bridgetown,
Castletownroche,
Caherduggan,
Carrigdownane,
Carrigleamleary,
Clenor,
Derryvillane,
Doneraile,
Dunmahon,
Farahy,
Glanworth,
Imphrick,
Kilcrumper,
Kilcummer,
Kildorrery,
Kilgullane,
Killathy,
Killeenemer,
Kilquane,
Litter,
Mallow,
Monanimy,
Mourneabbey,
Rahan,
St. Nathlash,
Templeroan,
and
Wallstown.

See also 
 List of civil parishes of County Cork
 List of townlands of the barony of Fermoy in County Cork
 Baron Fermoy

References
From :

From other sources:

External links
  Source given is "Ordnance survey".

Baronies of County Cork